Relish was an American band in the 1990s that began in Fullerton, California. Relish was composed of Michele Walker (vocals, guitar), Laurita Guaico (guitar, vocals), Gina Karaba (bass, vocals), and Lynnae Hitchcock (drums, vocals). Performing extensively through Southern California, and participating in the Warped Tour, they released a full-length self-titled CD in 1999 and a 7" single on Volcom Entertainment before disbanding.

Their music has been described as Black Sabbath meets Guided by Voices, featuring heavy guitars and unconventional time signatures.

Michele Walker now performs as a solo artist, Laurita Guaico plays bass for Spare Parts For Broken Hearts and was a member of The Randies, Gina Karaba is a renowned glass sculptor, and Lynnae Hitchcock was a member of the Human Value. Sarah Green joined Relish in 1999, after Gina Karaba left the band. Green was with Relish as a bass player until they disbanded after recording their last EP with limited release. Sarah Green is founder of Long Beach band, Spare Parts for Broken Hearts, and is joined by Guaico on guitar/bass. Both are still making records under that name.

Rock music groups from California
Musical groups from Orange County, California